Kursaal is an electoral ward of Southend-on-Sea covering the area east of Southend town centre. It is represented by three local government councillors, each elected to serve a four-year term. Kursaal was one of the four new wards created in 2000 during boundary changes in Southend.

Boundaries
The wards boundaries are Victoria road in the east, with half the road being in Thorpe. The queensway ring road in the west. The seafront around Marine Parade in the south, and multiple smaller roads in the north. It borders Thorpe, Milton, St Lukes and Victoria. While it also shares a small border with Southchurch ward along Surbiton Avenue. They have remained this way since the wards creation in 2001.

Ward Profile
The ward is defined by many different features, the Woodgrange estate and Southchurch Village makes up a large portion of the south of the ward and houses many of its inhabitants.The ward is one of the most sought after areas of Southend. With parks, a museum,  newly planted trees and award winning beaches.  Also has a direct train line to London. Southend East to Fenchurch Street. Also linked to Lakeside shopping center and retail park. Just 25 mins via train

Councillors
These are all councillors elected since Kursaal ward was created in 2001

 Indicates Councillor elected that year.
 Indicates Councillor defected to the Conservatives.

Elections

Elections in the 2020s

Elections in the 2010s

No UKIP (-19.0) or Green (-8.4) candidates as previous.

No English Democrat candidate as previous (-16.9).

No BNP (-6.5) Independent (-11.1) or English Democrat (-1.6) candidates as previous

Elections in the 2000s

References

Electoral wards of Southend-on-Sea